Mutlu is a belde (town) town in Babaeski district of Kırklareli Province, Turkey, Crimean Tatars in Turkey, the distance to Babaeski is .

Populated places in Kırklareli Province
Towns in Turkey
Babaeski District